IBM RSA may refer to:

IBM Rational Software Architect  - modeling and development software environment
IBM Remote Supervisor Adapter - hardware for x86 servers management